Andrew B. Whinston (born June 3, 1936) is an American economist and computer scientist. He is the Hugh Roy Cullen Centennial Chair in Business Administration, Professor of Information Systems, Computer Science and Economics, and Director of the Center for Research in Electronic Commerce (CREC) in the McCombs School of Business at the University of Texas at Austin.

In the late 1950s, he was Sanxsay Fellow at Princeton University. Whinston finished his PhD from the Carnegie Institute of Technology in 1962, at which time he also received its Alexander Henderson Award for Excellence in Economic Theory. He started work at the Yale University economics department, where he was a member of the Cowles Foundation. He became an associate professor of economics at the University of Virginia in 1964. By 1966 he was a full professor at Purdue University, where he became the university's inaugural Weiler Distinguished Professor of management, economics, and computer science.

He began his contributions to the academic world in 1961 when he published a paper in a law journal on the topic of urban renewal. In 1962 he published his first two papers. The first was in the Journal of Political Economy where he showed how non-cooperative game theory could be applied to issues in microeconomics. In the second paper entitled "A Model of Multi-Period Investment under Uncertainty" which appeared in Management Science he used nonlinear optimization methods to determine optimal portfolios over time.

In 1996 he was the first to publish a book on electronic commerce entitled Frontiers of Electronic Commerce; this 800-page book covered technical, social and economic issues of electronic commerce. The book was translated into several languages and was used as required reading for graduate programs across the country and worldwide.

Publications
Whinston has papers in economics journals such as American Economic Review, Econometrica, Review of Economic Studies, Journal of Economic Theory, Journal of Financial Economics, Journal of Mathematical Economics, in multidisciplinary journals such as Management Science, Decision Sciences, and Organization Science, in operations journals such as Operations Research, European Journal of Operational Research, Production and Operations Management, Journal of Production Research, and Naval Research Logistics, in mathematics journals such as Journal of Combinatorics, SIAM Journal on Applied Mathematics, and Discrete Mathematics, in accounting journals such as the Accounting Review and Auditing: A Journal of Practice and Theory, in marketing journals such as Marketing Science, Journal of Marketing, Journal of Marketing Research, and Journal of Retailing, in the premier journals devoted to information systems – Management Science, Decision Support Systems, MIS Quarterly, Journal of Management Information Systems, and Information Systems Research - and in computer science journals such as Communications of the ACM, ACM Transactions on Database Systems, ACM Transactions, IEEE Computing on Internet Technology, and ACM Journal on Mobile Networking and Applications.

His publication record consists of more than 25 books and 400 refereed publications.

Awards

In 1995, Whinston was honored by the Data Processing Manager's Association with its IS Educator of the Year Award. In 2005, Whinston received the LEO Award for Lifetime Exceptional Achievement in Information Systems. This award, created by the Council of the Association for Information Systems and the executive committee of the International Conference on Information Systems, recognizes the work of outstanding contributors to the Information Systems discipline.

In 2009, Whinston was honored with the Career Award for Outstanding Research Contributions at The University of Texas at Austin for singularly significant research contributions made by a tenured or tenure-track faculty member over an extended period of time. Also in 2009, the INFORMS Information System Society (ISS) honored  Whinston by recognizing him as the inaugural INFORMS ISS Fellow for outstanding contributions to IS research.

Bibliography

See also
 Chance-constrained portfolio selection

References

External links
Andrew Whinston's personal website
Presentation of Andrew B. Whinston at UT Austin
The Center for Research in Electronic Commerce
Andrew Whinston's CV

American economists
American computer scientists
Princeton University fellows
Carnegie Mellon University alumni
Yale University faculty
Purdue University faculty
McCombs School of Business faculty
1936 births
Living people
Information systems researchers